CHMP may refer to:

Committee for Medicinal Products for Human Use
CHMP-FM, a French-language talk radio station located in Montreal, Quebec
Charged multivesicular body protein (disambiguation) also known as CHMP
CHMP1A
CHMP1B
CHMP2A
CHMP2B
CHMP4A
CHMP4B
CHMP4C
CHMP5
CHMP6